Patrick Sullivan is a former American football executive who served as general manager of the New England Patriots from 1983 to 1990.

Early life
The son of Patriots founder Billy Sullivan, Sullivan was a ballboy for the first Boston Patriots team.

In 1976, he graduated from Boston College.

New England Patriots
After graduating college, Sullivan spent two years as the manager of Schaefer Stadium. In 1979, he was named assistant general manager. On February 17, 1983, Sullivan was promoted to general manager.

During his tenure as general manager, the Patriots had a 66–65 record and made the playoffs twice, including an appearance in Super Bowl XX.

After the Patriots 1985 Divisional Playoff victory against the Los Angeles Raiders, Sullivan was struck by Raiders linebacker Matt Millen on the head. Millen hit Sullivan in retaliation for Sullivan's heckling of Raider Howie Long from the sidelines.

After Boston Herald reporter Lisa Olson complained of being sexually harassed in the Patriots' locker room, team chairman and majority owner Victor Kiam sought to suspend Sullivan. However, National Football League Commissioner Paul Tagliabue stepped in and prevented the suspension.

On December 20, 1990, Kiam named Sam Jankovich CEO of the Patriots and gave him complete control of the organization. On January 29, Sullivan announced his resignation.

Post-Patriots
Since 1993, Sullivan has served as President of Game Creek Video, a company he founded that provides television production trucks for sporting events.

References

Year of birth missing (living people)
Living people
Boston College alumni
National Football League general managers
New England Patriots executives
Buckingham Browne & Nichols School alumni